Anselm of Lucca (1036 – 18 March 1086), born Anselm of Baggio, was a medieval bishop of Lucca in Italy and a prominent figure in the Investiture Controversy amid the fighting in central Italy between Matilda, countess of Tuscany, and Emperor Henry IV.

Life
Born in Mantua, and was educated there in grammar and dialectic. Anselm was a nephew of Anselm of Lucca the Elder, who became Pope Alexander II in 1061 and designated Anselm to succeed him in his former position as Bishop of Lucca. Alexander sent him to Germany advising him to take investiture from Emperor Henry IV. Alexander II, may have elevated him to the cardinalate ca. 1062.

Anselm went to Germany, but was loath to receive the insignia of spiritual power from a temporal ruler and returned without investiture. In 1073, Pope Gregory VII, again appointed Anselm Bishop of Lucca, but advised him not to accept investiture from Henry IV. For some reason, Anselm did so this time, but soon felt such remorse that he resigned his bishopric, and entered the Benedictine Order at Padilirone, a Cluniac monastery near Mantua.

Gregory VII ordered him to return to Lucca, and he reluctantly obeyed, but continued to lead the life of a monk. In the years 1077–79, he accepted the transfer of several castles from Countess Matilda, in preparation for Henry's expected campaign, which was carried out in 1081–84. Meanwhile, he attempted to impose the Rule of Saint Augustine upon the canons of his cathedral. Most of the canons refused to submit to the new regulations though they were interdicted by the pope. Anselm was expelled from Lucca around 1080, with the help of Emperor Henry and Guibert, Antipope Clement III, after the defeat of the papal defender, the Countess Matilda of Tuscany at the Battle of Volta Mantovana (October 1080).

Anselm fled first to the shelter of Moriana, an episcopal stronghold only a few miles up the Arno from Lucca— accompanied by Bardo, a priest who later wrote his vita—then retired to Canossa as spiritual guide to Countess Matilda. Bishop Benzo of Alba, Henry IV's fiercely partisan supporter, tells how Matilda and Anselm stripped the monasteries to send gold and silver to Gregory in Rome. Because through his prayers was obtained the rout of the enemies of Gregory VII, he is represented before an army in confusion.

Some time later Gregory VII made him papal legate in Lombardy, with authorization to rule over all the dioceses which had been left without bishops due to the conflict between pope and emperor.

Anselm was well versed in scripture and wrote some important works attacking lay investiture and defending Pope Gregory against Antipope Clement III and Emperor Henry IV. He spent his last years assembling a collection of ecclesiastical law canons in 13 books, which formed the earliest of the collections of canons (Collectio canonum) supporting the Gregorian reforms, which afterwards were incorporated into the well-known Decretum of the jurist Gratian. The Collectio canonum most notably revived the Justinian’s Novellae, which set the basis for Roman law in the middle ages.
 
Anselm died in Mantua on 18 March 1086, and is regarded as the patron saint of that city. Two biographies were written about the bishop-saint shortly after his death: Pseudo-Bardone’s Vita Anselmi episcopi Lucensis and Bishop Rangerius of Lucca’s, Vita metrica of S. Anselmi lucensis episcopi. Anselm was canonized by Pope Victor III in 1087.

References

External links
Projekt PseudoIsidor: Die Sammlung Anselms von Lucca (in German)
Matilda of Tuscany: material concerning Anselm of Lucca
Sant'Anselmo a Mantova (Italian)

Further reading
Nash, Penelope (2021). The Spirituality of Countess Matilda of Tuscany. Quaderni di Matildica I. Patron Bologna. (ISBN 978-8-855-53529-8) https://www.patroneditore.com/volumi/9788855535298/the-spirituality-of-countess-matilda-of-tuscany


1036 births
1086 deaths
Clergy from Mantua
Investiture Controversy
11th-century Italian cardinals
Bishops of Lucca
Cardinal-nephews
11th-century Italian Roman Catholic bishops
11th-century Christian saints
Medieval Italian saints
11th-century jurists
11th-century Italian writers
11th-century Latin writers